Joaquim Filipe Ferreira dos Santos Videira (born 1 December 1984) is a Portuguese fencer from Viseu. He was the épée world vice champion in 2006.

Biography
Joaquim Videira started fencing under the direction of his coach, the Hélder Alves.

In 2006, he won the silver medal in the World Fencing Championships (best result ever for Portuguese fencing) losing in a sudden death period. He has also won medals in Grand Prix and World Cups.

He represented the following clubs:
Presently - Associação dos Antigos Alunos do Colégio Militar
2004-2006 - Centro de Convívio e Desportivo de Vale de Milhaços
2002-2004 - Associação dos Pupilos do Exército
1996-2002 - Instituto Militar dos Pupilos do Exército

Joaquim Videira was supported by the project Olympic Hopes in 2005 and he integrates the Beijing 2008 Project since 2006 in its higher level (Level 1 - Medal winner) from the National Olympic Committee of Portugal.

He is one of a few competition fencers who use the French grip as opposed to the pistol.

It is important to distinguish the fair play of this athlete which has given him the Fair Play Award of the National Olympic Committee of Portugal. During a fight in the World Championship, Videira refused a point after he touched with his sword on the floor. He convinced the jury but lost the combat being eliminated from the competition.

At the Beijing Olympics in 2008 he was eliminated in the second round.

Videira is also an Electronics Engineer with a degree from the Faculty of Engineering of the Oporto's University. He will follow his academic studies by taking a master's degree.

Accomplishments
Individual results up to 10th place

2008

6th Lisbon World Cup
8th Bern World Cup

2007

1st Sydney World Cup
3rd Paris World Cup
3rd Bogotá World Cup
3rd World Ranking (Best ever)

2006

2nd Turin World Championships
5th Montreal Grand Prix
9th Kish Island World Cup

2005

7th Copenhagen European Championships

Youth (2000-2005)

3rd Ponte de Sôr World Cup
3rd Cairo World Cup
3rd Conegliano European Junior Championships
5th Helsinki World Cup
5th Catania World Cup
5th Bratislava World Cup
5th Junior World Ranking
6th Luxemburg World Cup

Awards
Aquilino Ribeiro Trophy, Sports Trophy given by the Jornal do Centro in 2007
Olympic Medal given by the National Olympic Committee of Portugal in 2007
Nomination for Athlete of the Year by the Portugal Sports Confederation in 2006
Fair Play award given by the National Olympic Committee of Portugal in 2004
Fencing Youth Hope given by the Portugal Sports Confederation in 2004
Honors of the Youth Award given by the National Olympic Committee of Portugal in 2002

References

External links

National Olympic Committee of Portugal (Olympic Project)

1984 births
Living people
People from Viseu
Fencers at the 2008 Summer Olympics
Olympic fencers of Portugal
Portuguese male épée fencers
Sportspeople from Viseu District